The Apracharajas (Kharosthi: 𐨀𐨤𐨿𐨪𐨕𐨪𐨗 , , 𐨀𐨤𐨕𐨪𐨗), also known as Avacarajas (Kharosthi: 𐨀𐨬𐨕𐨪𐨗), were an Indo-Scythian ruling dynasty of present-day western Pakistan and eastern Afghanistan. The Apracharaja capital, known as Apracapura (also Avacapura), was located in the Bajaur district of the Khyber-Pakhtunkhwa, Pakistan. Apraca rule of Bajaur lasted from the 1st century BCE to the 1st century CE.

Origins
Before the arrival of the Indo-Greeks and the Indo-Scythians, Apracan territory was the stronghold of the warlike Aspasioi tribe of Arrian, recorded in Vedic Sanskrit texts as Ashvakas. The Apracas are known in history for having offered a stubborn resistance to the Macedonian invader, Alexander the Great in 326 BCE.

The Indo-Scythians of the Apracharajas dynasty were successors of the Indo-Scythian king Azes. It seems that they established their dynasty from around 12 BCE. Their territory seems to have centered in Bajaur and extended to Swat, Gandhāra, Taxila, and parts of eastern Afghanistan.

Buddhism
The Apracharajas embraced Buddhism: they are known for their numerous Buddhist dedications on reliquaries. On their coins Hellenic designs, derived from the coinage of the Indo-Greeks, continued to appear alongside Buddhist ones.

 Vijayamitra (ruled 12 BCE - 15 CE) personally dedicated in his name a Buddhist reliquary, the Shinkot casket. Some of his coins bear the Buddhist triratna symbol.
Indravarman, while still a Prince, personally dedicated in 5-6 CE a Buddhist reliquary, the Bajaur casket, now in the Metropolitan Museum of Art.

Numerous Buddhist dedications were made by the rulers of the Apracas:

A recently discovered inscription in Kharoshthi on a Buddhist reliquary, the Bajaur reliquary inscription, gives a relationship between several eras of the period and mentions several Apraca rulers:

This inscription would date to c. 15 CE, according to the new dating for the Azes era which places its inception c. 47 BCE. The rulers seem to have been related to Kharaostes.

The Apraca kings are also mentioned in the Bajaur casket.

Apraca Rulers and their Queens

See also
 Ashvakas
 Apraca King Imdravarmo's Silver Reliquary

References

Ancient history of Pakistan
Empires and kingdoms of Pakistan
Indo-Scythian peoples